ISNA or Isna may refer to:

 Intersex Society of North America, a non-profit advocacy group
 Iranian Students News Agency, a news organization led by Iranian activists
 Islamic Society of North America, based in Plainfield, Indiana
 Isna River, Portugal

See also
 IISNA, the Islamic Information and Services Network of Australasia
 Esna, an ancient Egyptian city